The 2021 UEFA European Under-21 Championship Final was a football match that took place on 6 June 2021 at the Stožice Stadium in Ljubljana, Slovenia, to determine the winners of the 2021 UEFA European Under-21 Championship. The match was contested by Germany and Portugal.

Germany won the match 1–0 for their third UEFA European Under-21 Championship title.

Route to the final

Match

Details

Notes

References

External links

Final
UEFA European Under-21 Championship finals
Germany national under-21 football team
2020–21 in German football
Portugal national under-21 football team
2020–21 in Portuguese football
Sports competitions in Ljubljana
21st century in Ljubljana
2020–21 in Slovenian football